The 2017 North Carolina Central Eagles football team represented North Carolina Central University in the 2017 NCAA Division I FCS football season. They were led by fourth-year head coach Jerry Mack. The Eagles played their home games at O'Kelly–Riddick Stadium. They were a member of the Mid-Eastern Athletic Conference (MEAC). They finished the season 7–4, 5–3 in MEAC play to finish in a tie for fourth place.

On December 8, head coach Jerry Mack resigned to become the offensive coordinator at Rice. He finished at North Carolina Central with a four-year record of 31–15.

Schedule

Source: Schedule

Game summaries

at Duke

Shaw

South Carolina State

at Florida A&M

at Howard

Gardner–Webb

Norfolk State

Delaware State

at Hampton

Bethune–Cookman

at North Carolina A&T

Ranking movements

References

North Carolina Central
North Carolina Central Eagles football seasons
North Carolina Central Eagles football